The 2015 independent.ie Fitzgibbon Cup was the 99th staging of the Fitzgibbon Cup since its establishment in 1912. The semi-finals were hosted by Limerick IT on 27 February 2015 with the final played the following day at the Gaelic Grounds, Limerick.

University of Limerick won the cup, defeating WIT in a replayed final on 11 March.

Carlow IT Controversy
Carlow IT were disqualified on 16 February 2015 for fielding a part-time student James Gannon. Carlow IT appealed the decision on 18 February 2015, the appeal was upheld and the decision to disqualify Carlow IT was overturned. On 24 February 2015 Mary I's request for an interlocutory injunction was refused by the Disputes Resolution Authority (DRA). This meant that the remaining quarter-finals could go ahead on that same day.

Fixtures and results

Group A

Group B

Group C

Maynooth University v Mary I Limerick was initially scheduled for 29 January 2014 but postponed due to snow

Having won the original fixture by 4-17 to 1-17, IT Carlow were later found guilty of playing an illegal player. James Gannon was deemed to be a part-time student and therefore ineligible. The fixture was retrospectively awarded to Mary I Limerick. This meant that Carlow IT finished third in Group C. IT Carlow then won an appeal against this decision and were re-awarded the fixture despite another late Mary I Limerick request for an interlocutory injunction to the DRA.

Group D

Quarter-finals
Group winners had home advantage for the quarter-finals.

Semi-finals

Final

References

External links
2015 Fitzgibbon Cup Fixtures
GAA Higher Education Official Website

Fitzgibbon
Fitzgibbon Cup